Kent Rogert (born September 15, 1972) is a former member of the Nebraska Legislature from Tekamah, Nebraska, United States.

Born in Blair, Nebraska, he graduated from Tekamah-Herman High School in 1991. He graduated from the University of Nebraska-Lincoln in 1995.

He was elected to the Legislature in 2006 serving Nebraska's 16th legislative district. He served on the General Affairs, Urban Affairs, Judiciary, Rules, and State-Tribal Relations committees.

Previous to joining the Nebraska Legislature he was employed by Garst Seed Company.

References
 

1972 births
Living people
Democratic Party Nebraska state senators
People from Blair, Nebraska
People from Tekamah, Nebraska